Inge Wischnewski, née Kabisch, (2 March 1930 – 11 July 2010) was a German figure skater and figure skating coach. She was a four-time East German national champion.

Career 
Inge Kabisch won the East German national title four times, always beating Jutta Müller. Her strength were spins. She was coached by Charlotte Giebelmann.

In 1956, Manfred Ewald sent her and other skaters to study coaching at the DHfK Leipzig. She settled in East Berlin where she worked as a coach under her married name, Inge Wischnewski. Her students included:
 Christine Errath (1974 World champion and 1976 Olympic bronze medalist)
 Janina Wirth (1982 World Junior champion)
 Uwe Kagelmann (1972 and 1976 Olympic pairs' bronze medalist)
 Rolf Österreich (1976 Olympic pairs' silver medalist)
 Alexander König (1982 World Junior men's bronze medalist and 1988 European pairs' bronze medalist)
 Ralph Borghard
 Heidemarie Steiner
 Bernd Wunderlich (1975 East German national champion)
 Kerstin Stolfig

Wischnewski coached in Norway from 1991 to 1996, after which she returned to Berlin. Her former student, Christine Errath, wrote a book about her titled Die Pirouettenkönigin (The Spin Queen).

Personal life 
Inge Kabisch was born on 2 March 1930 in Weißenfels, Weimar Republic. She married Heinz Wischnewski and took his surname. In 1958, she gave birth to their daughter, Ina. She died in July 2010 after a short illness.

Results

References

1930 births
2010 deaths
People from Weißenfels
People from the Province of Saxony
German female single skaters
German figure skating coaches
Female sports coaches
Recipients of the Patriotic Order of Merit
Recipients of the Banner of Labor
East German figure skaters
Sportspeople from Saxony-Anhalt